Some of My Best Friends Are the Blues is an album by blues vocalist Jimmy Witherspoon which was recorded in Sweden in 1964 and released on the Prestige label.

Reception

Scott Yanow, writing for AllMusic, stated: "Nothing all that memorable occurs, but the singer is in strong voice, and his fans will want to pick up this".

Track listing 
 "Some of My Best Friends Are the Blues" (Al Byron, Woody Harris) - 2:55     
 "Everytime I Think About You" (Claude Demetrius) - 2:39     
 "I Never Will Marry" (Traditional) - 2:48     
 "I Wanna Be Around" (Johnny Mercer, Sadie Vimmerstedt) - 3:27     
 "Teardrops from My Eyes" (Rudy Toombs) - 2:59     
 "And the Angels Sing" (Ziggy Elman, Johnny Mercer) - 2:55     
 "Who's Sorry Now?" (Bert Kalmar, Harry Ruby, Ted Snyder) - 3:37     
 "I'm Comin Down With the Blues" (Don Covay) - 2:23     
 "You're Next" (Sid Tepper) - 2:16     
 "Happy Blues" (Tony Bruno) - 2:14     
 "That's Why I'm Leaving" (Lockie Edwards, Jr.) - 2:32     
 "One Last Chance" (Jimmy Witherspoon) - 3:12

Personnel 
Jimmy Witherspoon - vocals
Benny Bailey, Bertil Lövgren, Bengt-Arne Wallin - trumpet
Åke Persson, Eje Thelin - trombone
Karl Nystrom, Bengt Olesson - French horn
Runo Erickson - euphonium
Lars Sloglund - oboe, English horn
Arne Domnerus - alto saxophone, clarinet
Bjarne Nerem - tenor saxophone
Rune Falk - baritone saxophone, clarinet
Tosten Wennberg - saxophones, clarinet
Roman Dylag - bass
Egil Johansen - drums
Benny Golson - arranger

References 

Jimmy Witherspoon albums
1964 albums
Prestige Records albums
Albums arranged by Benny Golson